L'Isle-Jourdain is a commune in the Vienne department in the Nouvelle-Aquitaine region in western France.

Notable residents
 Louis Fabien (1924–2016), pseudonym of a French painter who used a modern form of pointillism

See also
Communes of the Vienne department

References

Communes of Vienne
Poitou
Vienne communes articles needing translation from French Wikipedia